Brigham and Women's Faulkner Hospital (BWFH) is a 171-bed, non-profit community teaching hospital located in Boston, Massachusetts.  Founded in 1900, it is located in the neighborhood of Jamaica Plain across the street from the Arnold Arboretum and just  from Longwood Medical and Academic Area.

Faulkner Hospital joined with Brigham and Women's Hospital in 1998 to form a common parent company, Brigham and Women's/Faulkner Hospitals, a member of Mass General Brigham. The resulting partnership offers Brigham and Women's Faulkner Hospital patients access to many of the same physicians and services as Brigham and Women's Hospital.

"The Faulkner" (as it is popularly known) offers comprehensive medical, surgical and psychiatric care as well as complete emergency, outpatient and diagnostic services.  The hospital's largest inpatient services are internal medicine, cardiology, psychiatry, orthopedics, gastroenterology and general/GI surgery. Effective October 1, 2012, Faulkner Hospital was renamed to Brigham and Women's Faulkner Hospital (BWFH).

See also 
 Lists of hospitals

References

External links
Brigham and Women's Faulkner Hospital
Brigham and Women's Faulkner Hospital Careers
Faulkner Hospital history book

Hospital buildings completed in 1900
Teaching hospitals in Massachusetts
Hospitals in Boston
Hospitals established in 1900
Harvard Medical School
Tufts University